The 1989–90 Northern Counties East Football League season was the 8th in the history of Northern Counties East Football League, a football competition in England.

Premier Division

The Premier Division featured 15 clubs which competed in the previous season, along with three new clubs:
North Shields, transferred from the Northern League
Sheffield, promoted from Division One
Sutton Town, relegated from the Northern Premier League

Map

League table

Division One

Division One featured 13 clubs which competed in the previous season, along with two new clubs, promoted from Division Two:
Liversedge
Ossett Town

Map

League table

Division Two

Division One featured 12 clubs which competed in the previous season, along with two new clubs, relegated from Division One:
Bradley Rangers
Pilkington Recreation

Map

League table

References

1989–90
8